Eva Vanvik is a former Norwegian curler.

Teams

References

External links
 

The Dream Team takes on the world | Maclean's | APRIL 18, 1983

Living people
Norwegian female curlers
Norwegian curling champions
Year of birth missing (living people)